Hebius modestus, commonly known as the modest keelback or Günther's keelback,  is a species of natricine snake endemic to Asia.

Geographic range
It is found in Burma, Cambodia, China (especially Guangdong, Guizhou, and Yunnan), India (particularly Assam, Meghalaya), northern Laos, Thailand, and Vietnam.

Description
Adults may attain 60 cm (2 feet) in overall length; tail length 18 cm (7 inches).

Dorsally the modest keelback is olive brown with small black spots. It has a series of small yellowish spots, or a yellowish stripe, along each side of its back. The labial sutures are black. Ventrally it may be yellowish with a series of blackish spots on each side of the ventrals, or yellowish in the middle and blackish on the sides, or almost entirely blackish.

The dorsal scales are in 19 rows, weakly keeled. Ventrals 154-168; anal divided; subcaudals 96-122, also divided.

Habitat
In India this species is found in forests at altitudes of 600-1,500 m (approximately 2,000-5,000 feet).

References

External links
  Amphiesma modestus at the Reptile Database

Further reading
 
 Günther, A. 1875. Second Report on Collections of Indian Reptiles obtained by the British Museum. Proc. Zool. Soc. London 1875: 224–234. (Tropidonotus modestus, p. 232.)

modestus
Taxa named by Albert Günther
Reptiles described in 1875